Sun Ye (born January 15, 1989, in Shanghai) is an Olympic medal winning swimmer from China. She swam for China at the 2008 Olympics, where she was part of China's 400 Medley Relay which finished 3rd, and the 2012 Summer Olympics.

Major achievements
2008 Olympics - 7th 100m breaststroke, 3rd 400m Medley Relay
2008 Short Course Worlds - 4th 200m breaststroke
2009 Asian Swimming Championships - 1st 200m breaststroke

See also
China at the 2012 Summer Olympics - Swimming

References

1989 births
Living people
Olympic bronze medalists for China
Olympic swimmers of China
Swimmers from Shanghai
Swimmers at the 2008 Summer Olympics
Swimmers at the 2012 Summer Olympics
Olympic bronze medalists in swimming
World Aquatics Championships medalists in swimming
Medalists at the FINA World Swimming Championships (25 m)
Asian Games medalists in swimming
Swimmers at the 2010 Asian Games
Medalists at the 2008 Summer Olympics
Universiade medalists in swimming
Asian Games silver medalists for China
Medalists at the 2010 Asian Games
Universiade gold medalists for China
Medalists at the 2011 Summer Universiade
Chinese female breaststroke swimmers
21st-century Chinese women